Gonçalo Filipe Jesus Pinto (born 30 April 2000) is a Portuguese professional footballer who plays as a goalkeeper for Chaves.

Career
Pinto is a youth product of the academies of GC Corroios, Sporting CP, Almada, Belenenses, and Cova da Piedade. He signed his first professional contract with Sporting CP B in July 2020, and shortly after joined União Santarém on loan for the 2020–21 season in the Campeonato de Portugal. He was the backup goalkeeper for Sporting CP B in the 2021–22 season. On 18 August 2022, he transferred to the Primeira Liga club Chaves. He spent the first half of the 2022–23 season on loan with Pedras Salgadas. He returned to Chaves in December 2022 and made his professional debut with them in a 2–1 Taça da Liga loss to Mafra on 16 December 2022.

International career
Pinto is a youth international for Portugal, having made one appearance for the Portugal U19s.

References

External links
 

2000 births
Living people
Sportspeople from Almada
Portuguese footballers
Portugal youth international footballers
Sporting CP B players
Juventude de Pedras Salgadas players
G.D. Chaves players
Association football goalkeepers
Campeonato de Portugal (league) players
Primeira Liga players